These 185 species belong to Tetrix, a genus of ground hoppers or pygmy grasshoppers in the family Tetrigidae.

Tetrix species

 Tetrix aelytra Deng, W.-A., Z. Zheng & S.-Z. Wei, 2009 c g
 Tetrix akagiensis Uchida, M. & Ichikawa, 1999 c g
 Tetrix albistriatus Yao, Yanping & Z. Zheng, 2006 c g
 Tetrix albomaculatus Zheng, Z. & G. Jiang, 2006 c g
 Tetrix albomarginis Zheng, Z. & X. Nie, 2005 c g
 Tetrix albomarginisoides Deng, W.-A., 2016 c g
 Tetrix albonota Zheng, Z., 2005 c g
 Tetrix americana Hancock, 1909 i c g
 Tetrix andeanum (Hebard, 1923) c g
 Tetrix arcunotus Ingrisch, 2001 c g
 Tetrix arenosa Burmeister, 1838 i c g b  (obscure pygmy grasshopper)
 Tetrix areolata Westwood, 1841 c g
 Tetrix baditibialis Deng, W.-A., 2016 c g
 Tetrix baoshanensis Zheng, Wei & Liu, 1999
 Tetrix barbifemura Zheng, Z., 1998 c g
 Tetrix barbipes Zheng, Z., 2004 c g
 Tetrix beibuwanensis Zheng, Z. & G. Jiang, 1994 c g
 Tetrix beihaiensis Deng, W.-A. & Z. Zheng, 2007 c g
 Tetrix bipunctata (Linnaeus, 1758) c g
 Tetrix bipunctatus (Linnaeus, 1758) i
 Tetrix bolivari Saulcy, 1901 c g
 Tetrix brachynota Zheng, Z. & W.-A. Deng, 2004 c g
 Tetrix brevicornis Zheng, Z., L.-L. Lin & F.-M. Shi, 2012 c g
 Tetrix brevipennis Zheng, Z. & X. Ou, 2010 c g
 Tetrix brunneri (I. Bolivar, 1877) i b  (brunner pygmy grasshopper)
 Tetrix brunnerii (Bolívar, I., 1887) c g
 Tetrix cavifrontalis Liang, G., 1998 c g
 Tetrix cenwanglaoshana Zheng, Z., G. Jiang & Jianwen Liu, 2005 c g
 Tetrix ceperoi (Bolívar, I., 1887) c g (Cepero's groundhopper)
 Tetrix ceperoides Zheng, Z. & G. Jiang, 1997 c g
 Tetrix changbaishanensis Ren, Bingzhong, Liming Wang & X. Sun, 2003 c g
 Tetrix changchunensis Wang, R., Liming Wang & Bing Ren, 2005 c g
 Tetrix chichibuensis Uchida, M. & Ichikawa, 1999 c g
 Tetrix chongqingensis Zheng, Z. & F.-M. Shi, 2002 c g
 Tetrix cliva Zheng & Deng, 2004
 Tetrix collina Rehn, J.A.G., 1952 c g
 Tetrix condylops Gerstaecker, 1869 c g
 Tetrix crassivulva Denis, 1954
 Tetrix curvimarginus Zheng, Z. & W.-A. Deng, 2004 c g
 Tetrix cuspidata Hancock, J.L., 1907 c g
 Tetrix cyaneum (Stoll, C.) c g
 Tetrix dentifemura Zheng, Z., F.-M. Shi & G. Luo, 2003 c g
 Tetrix depressa Brisout de Barneville, 1848 c g
 Tetrix dimidiata Westwood, 1841 c g
 Tetrix dongningensis Wang, Liming, 2007 c g
 Tetrix dorrigensis Rehn, J.A.G., 1952 c g
 Tetrix dubiosus (Bolívar, I., 1887) c g
 Tetrix duolunensis Zheng, Z., 1996 c g
 Tetrix dushanensis Deng, W.-A., 2016 c g
 Tetrix ensifer Westwood, 1841 c g
 Tetrix erhaiensis Zheng, Z. & B.-Y. Mao, 1997 c g
 Tetrix ewenkensis Zheng, Z., F.-M. Shi & S.-L. Mao, 2010 c g
 Tetrix fengmanensis Ren, Bingzhong, T. Meng & X. Sun, 2003 c g
 Tetrix fuchuanensis Zheng, Z., 1998 c g
 Tetrix fuhaiensis Zheng, Z., L. Zhang, Liang Yang & Y.-F. Wang, 2006 c g
 Tetrix fuliginosa (Zetterstedt, 1828) c g
 Tetrix fuliginosaoides Deng, W.-A., 2016 c g
 Tetrix gavoyi Saulcy, 1901 c g
 Tetrix gibberosa (Wang, Yuwen & Z. Zheng, 1993) c g
 Tetrix gifuensis Storozhenko, Ichikawa & M. Uchida, 1994 c g
 Tetrix glochinota Zhao, L., Y. Niu & Z. Zheng, 2010 c g
 Tetrix gracilis Bruner, L., 1906 c g
 Tetrix granulata (Kirby, 1837) i
 Tetrix grossifemura Zheng, Z. & G. Jiang, 1997 c g
 Tetrix grossovalva Zheng, Z., 1994 c g
 Tetrix guangxiensis Zheng, Z. & G. Jiang, 1996 c g
 Tetrix guibeiensis Zheng, Z., Lu & Li, 2000 c g
 Tetrix guibeioides Deng, W.-A., Z. Zheng & S.-Z. Wei, 2007 c g
 Tetrix guilinica Li, Tianshan & Jiade Huang, 2000 c g
 Tetrix guinanensis Zheng, Z. & G. Jiang, 2002 c g
 Tetrix huanjiangensis Zheng, Z., F.-M. Shi & S.-L. Mao, 2010 c g
 Tetrix hururanus Ingrisch, 2001 c g
 Tetrix interrupta Zheng, Z., 2004 c g
 Tetrix irrupta (Bolívar, I., 1887) c g
 Tetrix japonica (Bolívar, I., 1887) c g
 Tetrix jigongshanensis Zhao, L., Y. Niu & Z. Zheng, 2010 c g
 Tetrix jilinensis Ren, Bingzhong, Liming Wang & T. Meng, 2004 c g
 Tetrix jingheensis Liang, G. & Z. Zheng, 1998 c g
 Tetrix jinshajiangensis Zheng, Z. & F.-M. Shi, 2001 c g
 Tetrix jiuwanshanensis Zheng, Z., 2005 c g
 Tetrix kantoensis Uchida, M. & Ichikawa, 1999 c g
 Tetrix kraussi Saulcy, 1888 c g
 Tetrix kunmingensis Zheng, Z. & X. Ou, 1993 c g
 Tetrix kunmingoides Zheng, Z., 2005 c g
 Tetrix langshanensis Deng, W.-A., 2016 c g
 Tetrix laticeps Westwood, 1841 c g
 Tetrix latifemuroides Zheng, Z. & L.-D. Xie, 2004 c g
 Tetrix latifemurus Zheng, Z. & L.-D. Xie, 2004 c g
 Tetrix latipalpa Cao, C. & Z. Zheng, 2011 c g
 Tetrix lativertex Zheng, Z., Kai Li & Z. Wei, 2002 c g
 Tetrix lativertexoides Deng, W.-A., 2016 c g
 Tetrix liuwanshanensis Deng, W.-A., Z. Zheng & S.-Z. Wei, 2007 c g
 Tetrix lochengensis Zheng, Z., 2005 c g
 Tetrix longipennioides Zheng, Z. & X. Ou, 2010 c g
 Tetrix longipennis Zheng, 2006
 Tetrix longzhouensis Zheng, Z. & G. Jiang, 2000 c g
 Tetrix macilenta Ichikawa, 1993 c g
 Tetrix maguanensis Deng, W.-A., Z. Zheng & S.-Z. Wei, 2007 c g
 Tetrix mandanensis Zheng, Z. & X. Ou, 2010 c g
 Tetrix minor Ichikawa, 1993 c g
 Tetrix misera (Walker, F., 1871) c g
 Tetrix montivaga Rehn, J.A.G., 1952 c g
 Tetrix morbillosus (Fabricius, 1787) c
 Tetrix munda (Walker, F., 1871) c g
 Tetrix nanpanjiangensis Deng, W.-A., Z. Zheng & S.-Z. Wei, 2008 c g
 Tetrix nanshanensis (Liang, G. & G. Jiang, 2014) c g
 Tetrix nanus Bruner, L., 1910 c g
 Tetrix neozhengi Huang, Jianhua, 2014 c g
 Tetrix nigricolle Walker, F., 1871 c g
 Tetrix nigrimaculata Zheng, Z. & F.-M. Shi, 2002 c g
 Tetrix nigrimarginis Zheng, Z. & X. Ou, 2004 c g
 Tetrix nigristriatus Zheng, Z. & X. Nie, 2005 c g
 Tetrix nigromaculata Zheng & Shi, 2002 g
 Tetrix nigrotibialis Chen, Zhen-Ning, Z. Zheng & Y. Zeng, 2010 c g
 Tetrix nikkoensis Uchida, M. & Ichikawa, 1999 c g
 Tetrix nodulosa (Fieber, 1853) c g
 Tetrix nonmaculata Zheng, Z. & X. Ou, 2004 c g
 Tetrix ochronotata Zheng, Z., 1998 c g
 Tetrix ornata (Say, 1824) i c g b  (ornate pygmy grasshopper)
 Tetrix parabarbifemura Zheng, Z. & X. Ou, 2004 c g
 Tetrix parabipunctata Zheng, Z. & X. Ou, 2004 c g
 Tetrix parabrachynota Zheng, Z., Hai-Jian Wang & F.-M. Shi, 2007 c g
 Tetrix phrynus Rehn, J.A.G., 1952 c g
 Tetrix priscus (Bolívar, I., 1887) c g
 Tetrix pseudodepressus (Ingrisch, 2006) c g
 Tetrix pseudosimulans Zheng, Z. & F.-M. Shi, 2010 c g
 Tetrix puerensis Zheng, Z., 2007 c g
 Tetrix qilianshanensis Zheng, Z. & Zhen-Ning Chen, 2000 c g
 Tetrix qinlingensis Zheng, Z., K. Huo & Hongjie Zhang, 2000 c g
 Tetrix rectimargina Zheng, Z. & Jiang, 2004 c g
 Tetrix reducta (Walker, F., 1871) c g
 Tetrix rongshuiensis Deng, W.-A., 2016 c g
 Tetrix ruyuanensis Liang, G., 1998 c g
 Tetrix sadoensis Storozhenko, Ichikawa & M. Uchida, 1994 c g
 Tetrix serrifemora Zheng
 Tetrix serrifemoralis Zheng, Z., 1998 c g
 Tetrix serrifemoroides Zheng, Z. & G. Jiang, 2002 c g
 Tetrix shaanxiensis Zheng, Z., 2005 c g
 Tetrix shennongjiaensis Zheng, Z., Kai Li & Z. Wei, 2002 c g
 Tetrix sierrana Rehn & Grant, 1956 i c g b  (sierra pygmy grasshopper)
 Tetrix sigillatum Bolívar, I., 1908 c g
 Tetrix signatus (Bolívar, I., 1887) c g
 Tetrix silvicultrix Ichikawa, 1993 c g
 Tetrix simulanoides Zheng, Z. & G. Jiang, 1996 c g
 Tetrix simulans (Bey-Bienko, 1929) c g
 Tetrix sinufemoralis Liang, G., 1998 c g
 Tetrix sipingensis Hao, X., Liming Wang & Bingzhong Ren, 2006 c g
 Tetrix slivae (Kostia, 1993)
 Tetrix subulata (Linnaeus, 1761) i c g b  (slender  groundhopper [Britain] or awl-shaped pygmy grasshopper [USA})
 Tetrix subulatoides Zheng, Z., L. Zhang, Liang Yang & Y.-F. Wang, 2006 c g
 Tetrix tartara (Saussure, 1887) c g
 Tetrix tenuicornis (Sahlberg, 1891) c g
 Tetrix tenuicornoides Wang, Liming, Haibin Yuan & Bingzhong Ren, 2006 c g
 Tetrix tereeshumerus Zheng, Z. & Y.-F. Wang, 2005 c g
 Tetrix tianensis Zheng, Z., 2005 c g
 Tetrix tinkhami Zheng, Z. & G. Liang, 1998 c g
 Tetrix torulosifemura Deng, W.-A., 2016 c g
 Tetrix torulosinota Zheng, Z., 1998 c g
 Tetrix torulosinotoides Zheng, Z. & Jiang, 2004 c g
 Tetrix totulihumerus Zheng, Z. & X. Nie, 2005 c g
 Tetrix transimacula Zheng, Z., 1998 c g
 Tetrix transsylvanica (Bazyluk & Kis, 1960) c g
 Tetrix tubercarina Zheng, Z. & G. Jiang, 1994 c g
 Tetrix tuberculata (Zheng, Z. & G. Jiang, 1997) c g
 Tetrix tuerki (Krauss, 1876) c g
 Tetrix undatifemura Zheng, Z., K. Huo & Hongjie Zhang, 2000 c g
 Tetrix undulata (Sowerby, 1806) c g (common groundhopper)
 Tetrix wadai Uchida & Ichikawa, 1999 c g
 Tetrix wagai Bazyluk, 1962 c g
 Tetrix weishanensis Zheng, Z. & B.-Y. Mao, 2002 c g
 Tetrix xianensis Zheng, Z., 1996 c g
 Tetrix xiangzhouensis Deng, W.-A., Z. Zheng & S.-Z. Wei, 2008 c g
 Tetrix xiaowutaishanensis Zheng, Z. & F.-M. Shi, 2010 c g
 Tetrix xinchengensis Deng, W.-A., Z. Zheng & S.-Z. Wei, 2007 c g
 Tetrix xinganensis Zheng, Z. & Shanyi Zhou, 1997 c g
 Tetrix xinjiangensis Zheng, Z., 1996 c g
 Tetrix yangshuoensis Li, Tianshan & Jiade Huang, 2000 c g
 Tetrix yaoshanensis Liang, G., 1998 c g
 Tetrix yizhouensis Zheng, Z. & W.-A. Deng, 2004 c g
 Tetrix yunlongensis Zheng, Z. & B.-Y. Mao, 2002 c g
 Tetrix yunnanensis Zheng, Z., 1992 c g
 Tetrix zayuensis Zheng, Z. & F.-M. Shi, 2009 c g
 Tetrix zhengi Jiang, G., 1994 c g
 Tetrix zhengioides Zheng, Z., 2004 c g
 Tetrix zhongshanensis Deng, W.-A., Z. Zheng & S.-Z. Wei, 2007 c g

Data sources: i = ITIS, c = Catalogue of Life, g = GBIF, b = Bugguide.net

References

List
Tetrix